Thummalapenta is a village in Kavali mandal, located on the east coast of Andhra Pradesh, India. It is a village of more than 1000 households and 4000 people. It is about 70km from Nellore and 9KM from Kavali. It is one of the tourist places in Nellore. The village has a beach with Haritha resort where people come to relax on the beach.
About 4000 people live in the village . The people are from different castes and communities. There are Hindus and Christians. Most of the people are dependent upon agriculture and aquaculture. 

There is an association of the people to develop the village. The association helps the poor people for loans at low interest. Villagers are cooperative. People organize volleyball and cricket tournament annually.
The climate of the village is very good. It is neither so cold and nor so hot. Pure drinking water is provided.

References

Villages in Nellore district